Paul II (died 27 December, 653) was the Ecumenical Patriarch of Constantinople from 1 October 641 to his death. He assumed regency for Byzantine emperor Constans II after a succession crisis in 641. Stephanos of Clypea (now Kelibia, in Tynisia) appears to have served as secretary/scribe of Patriarch Paulus II of Constantinople (641-653 AD) against the Monothelites, in 646 AD.  He was succeeded by Peter of Constantinople.

Paul II was elevated at the accession of the Byzantine emperor Constans II, who succeeded Heraclius, and just shortly before the pontificate of Pope Theodore I. Paul became patriarch at a time, when monophysitism was fragmenting the Byzantine Church. At first, he declared his adherence to the Orthodox Christology, then (646–647) accepted the compromise position of monothelitism put forward by his predecessors, Patriarchs Sergius and Pyrrhus. In 648 he backed with his authority the decree of Constans, known as the typos, which simply forbade all further discussion of the Christological question. Then in 649, along with Sergius and Pyrrhus, he was excommunicated and anathematized by the Lateran Synod called by Pope Martin I. This action, coupled with the fact that Martin's elevation had taken place without imperial sanction, resulted in the Emperor's seizing the pope and exiling him to the Chersonesus in 653, the year of Paul's death. Imperial attempts to solve the Monophysite controversy, either by compromise or enforced silence, lost their urgency by the end of Paul's tenure; by that time Arab conquests had overrun the most strongly Monophysitic provinces of the Byzantine Empire. The Monothelite compromise was abjured by the Byzantine Church itself at the Sixth Ecumenical Council (680–681), which declared Paul, among others, heretical.

References 

7th-century patriarchs of Constantinople
Byzantine regents